The  (German for 'leader principle') prescribed the fundamental basis of political authority in the Government of Nazi Germany. This principle can be most succinctly understood to mean that "the Führer's word is above all written law" and that governmental policies, decisions, and offices ought to work toward the realization of this end. In actual political usage, it refers mainly to the practice of dictatorship within the ranks of a political party itself, and as such, it has become an earmark of political fascism. Nazi Germany aimed to implement the leader principle at all levels of society, with as many organizations and institutions as possible being run by an individual appointed leader rather than by an elected committee. This included schools, sports associations, factories, and more. Nazi propaganda often focused on the theme of a single heroic leader overcoming the adversity of committees, bureaucrats and parliaments. German history, from Nordic sagas to Frederick the Great and Otto von Bismarck, was interpreted to emphasize the value of unquestioning obedience to a visionary leader.

Ideology
The  was not invented by the Nazis. Hermann von Keyserling, a Baltic German philosopher from Estonia, was the first to use the term. One of Keyserling's central claims was that certain "gifted individuals" were "born to rule" on the basis of Social Darwinism.

The ideology of the  sees each organization as a hierarchy of leaders, where every leader (in German) has absolute responsibility in his own area, demands absolute obedience from those below him and answers only to his superiors. This required obedience and loyalty even over concerns of right and wrong. The supreme leader, Adolf Hitler, answered to the German nation only. After the Night of the Long Knives, Hitler declared: "in this hour, I was responsible for the fate of the German nation and was therefore the supreme judge of the German people!"

The  paralleled the functionality of military organizations, which continue to use a similar authority structure today, although in democratic countries members are supposed to be restrained by codes of conduct. The  – German paramilitary organizations made up of men who had fought in World War I and been mustered out after Germany's defeat, but who found it impossible to return to civilian life – were run on the  principle. Many of the same men had, earlier in life, been part of various German youth groups in the period from 1904–1913. These groups had also accepted the idea of blind obedience to a leader.

In the case of the Nazis, the  became integral to the Nazi Party in July 1921, when Adolf Hitler forced a showdown with the original leaders of the party after he learned that they were attempting to merge it with the somewhat larger German Socialist Party. Learning of this, and knowing that any merger would dilute his influence over the group, Hitler quit the Nazis. Realizing that the party would be completely ineffective without Hitler as their front man, the founder of the party, Anton Drexler, opened negotiations with Hitler, who delivered an ultimatum: he must be recognized as the sole leader of the party, with dictatorial powers. The executive committee gave in to his demands, and Hitler rejoined the party a few days later to become its permanent ruler, with Drexler demoted to honorary chairman for life.

In time, as the party expanded, it fragmented somewhat, with the northern faction led by the Strasser brothers, Otto and Gregor, and including Joseph Goebbels, holding more Third Positionist views than the southern faction controlled by Hitler in Munich. They differed in other ways as well, including on the party's acceptance of the Führer Principle. In another confrontation engineered by Hitler, a party conference was called on February 14, 1926 in Bamberg.

Appointed mayors replaced elected local governments. Schools lost elected parents' councils and faculty advisory boards, with all authority being put in the headmaster's hands. The Nazis suppressed associations and unions with elected leaders, putting in their place mandatory associations with appointed leaders. Shop stewards had their authority carefully circumscribed to prevent their infringing on that of the plant leader. Eventually, virtually no activity or organization in Germany could exist that was completely independent of party or state leadership.

Hermann Göring told Nevile Henderson that: "When a decision has to be taken, none of us counts more than the stones on which we are standing. It is the  alone who decides". In practice, the selection of unsuitable candidates often led to micromanagement and commonly to an inability to formulate coherent policy. Albert Speer noted that many Nazi officials dreaded making decisions in Hitler's absence. Rules tended to become oral rather than written; leaders with initiative who flouted regulations and carved out their own spheres of influence might receive praise and promotion rather than censure.

Nazi propaganda

This was combined with the glorification of the one, central , Adolf Hitler. During the Night of Long Knives, it was claimed that his decisive action saved Germany, though it meant (in Goebbels's description) suffering "tragic loneliness" from being a Siegfried forced to shed blood to preserve Germany. In one speech Robert Ley explicitly proclaimed "The  is always right."

Carl Schmitt – drawn to the Nazi party by his admiration for a decisive leader praised him in his pamphlet State,  and Movement because only the ruthless will of such a leader could save Germany and its people from the "asphalt culture" of modernity, to bring about unity and authenticity.

Application
During the post-war Nuremberg Trials, Nazi war criminals – and, later, Adolf Eichmann during his trial in Israel – used the  concept to argue that they were not guilty of war crimes by claiming that they were only following orders. Eichmann may have declared his conscience was inconvenienced by war events in order to "do his job" as best he could.

In Eichmann in Jerusalem, Hannah Arendt concluded that, aside from a desire for improving his career, Eichmann showed no trace of anti-Semitism or psychological abnormalities whatsoever. She called him the embodiment of the "banality of evil", as he appeared at his trial to have an ordinary and common personality, displaying neither guilt nor hatred, denying any form of responsibility. Eichmann argued he was simply "doing his job" and maintained he had always tried to act in accordance with Immanuel Kant's categorical imperative. Arendt suggested that these statements most strikingly discredit the idea that Nazi criminals were manifestly psychopathic and different from common people, that even the most ordinary of people can commit horrendous crimes if placed in the catalyzing situation, and given the correct incentives. Arendt argued that children obey, whereas adults adhere to an ideology.

See also

Autocracy
Charisma
Cult of personality
Functionalism versus intentionalism

Milgram experiment
Nuremberg Defense
State of exception
Supreme leader
Superior orders

References
Notes

Bibliography
Koonz, Claudia (2003) The Nazi Conscience, Belknap. 
Leiser, Erwin (1975) Nazi Cinema, New York: Macmillan. 
Mitcham, Samuel W. (1996) Why Hitler? The Genesis of the Nazi Reich, Westport, Connecticut: Praeger. 
Nicholas, Lynn H. (2006) Cruel World: The Children of Europe in the Nazi Web, New York: Vintage.

External links
BBC historical article
Bearers of a Common Fate?
The Political System of the Third Reich

German words and phrases
Government of Nazi Germany
Nazi terminology
Political philosophy
Political terminology in Germany